Hagvi is a village in the Lori Province of Armenia.

References

Populated places in Lori Province